Ulice zpívá  is a Czech comedy film with Vlasta Burian. It was released in 1939.

External links
 

1939 films
1939 comedy films
Czechoslovak comedy films
Czechoslovak black-and-white films
1930s Czech films
1930s Czech-language films